Hooray for the Blue Hussars is a 1970 Danish comedy film directed by Annelise Reenberg and starring Emil Hass Christensen.

Cast

 Emil Hass Christensen - Oberst Parsdorff
 Lone Hertz - Charlotte Parsdorff
 Niels Hinrichsen - Løjtnant Adam Lercke
 Peter Bonke - Lt. Ditlev Liljenkrone
 Ghita Nørby - Frida
 Dirch Passer - Spjellerup
 Jørgen Kiil - Ritmester von Rabenberg
 Bjørn Puggaard-Müller - Pastor Berg
 Susse Wold - Henrietta / Clarissa
 Henny Lindorff Buckhøj - Pastorinden
 Ole Søltoft - Løjtnant
 Søren Strømberg - Løjtnant
 Peter Hetsch - Løjtnant
 Jørn Madsen - Løjtnant
 Thecla Boesen - Gæst hos pastorinden
 Lili Heglund - Gæst hos pastorinden
 Solveig Sundborg - Gæst hos pastorinden
 Karl Gustav Ahlefeldt - Adams' far
 Signi Grenness - Adam's mor
 Povl Wøldike - Ditlev's far
 Lilli Holmer - Ditlev's mor
 Paul Hagen - Krovært
 Hugo Herrestrup - Krovært
 Bendt Reiner - Husar
 Ulla Jessen - Dame på kro

External links

1970 films
Danish comedy films
1970s Danish-language films
1970 comedy films
Films directed by Annelise Reenberg
Films scored by Sven Gyldmark
Films set in 1893
Films based on British novels